Aleksander Petrov (born 21 May 1958, Plushkari, Yelovsky District) is a Russian political figure and a deputy of the 5th, 6th, 7th, and 8th State Dumas. In 2009, he was granted Candidate of Sciences in Economics degree. 

After graduating from the university, Petrov worked as a physics teacher and director of an incomplete secondary school in the village of Kalinovka (1979-1984). In 1995, he engaged in the pharmaceutical business in Sverdlovsk Oblast. From 2011 to 2016, he was the deputy of the 6th State Duma from the Sverdlovsk Oblast constituency. In 2016 and 2021, Petrov was re-elected for the 7th, and 8th State Dumas, respectively.

Awards  
 Order "For Merit to the Fatherland"

References

1958 births
Living people
United Russia politicians
21st-century Russian politicians
Eighth convocation members of the State Duma (Russian Federation)